The 2022 MLS Expansion Draft was a special draft for the Major League Soccer expansion team St. Louis City SC that was held on November 11, 2022. The list of exposed players was revealed on November 10, 2022. The picks were made on November 11, 2022 at 6:30 PM ET with St. Louis City SC selecting Nicholas Gioacchini, Indiana Vassilev, Jonathan Bell, John Nelson, and Jake LaCava.

Format
Teams who had players selected in the 2021 MLS Expansion Draft are exempt.  These teams are Austin FC, Atlanta United, D.C. United, Los Angeles FC, and New York City FC.  All other teams from the 2022 season are subject to the draft.  These teams have 12 protection slots that they may apply to any draft eligible player on their senior, and supplemental rosters. Players who have not graduated from Generation Adidas, and homegrown players age 25 and under as of the end of the 2022 season are not eligible for the draft.  Players with contracts expiring at the end of the season, designated players, and players with no-trade clauses are part of a team's roster and are eligible for the draft.  In the case of players with no-trade clauses, a team must use one of their protection slots for that player.  If a team has a players selected in the draft, that team becomes exempt from any further picks in the draft.  The expansion team, St. Louis City SC was given 5 picks for the draft.

Expansion Draft picks

Team-by-team-breakdown

Charlotte FC

Chicago Fire FC

FC Cincinnati

Colorado Rapids

Columbus Crew

FC Dallas

Houston Dynamo FC

Inter Miami CF

Sporting Kansas City

Los Angeles Galaxy

Minnesota United FC

CF Montréal

Nashville SC

New England Revolution

New York Red Bulls

Orlando City SC

Philadelphia Union

Portland Timbers

Real Salt Lake

San Jose Earthquakes

Seattle Sounders FC

Toronto FC

Vancouver Whitecaps FC

References

External links 
 2021 MLS Expansion Draft Rules

Major League Soccer Expansion Draft
MLS Expansion
St. Louis City SC
MLS Expansion Draft